Bull is an American drama television series starring Michael Weatherly. CBS ordered the program to series on May 13, 2016, and it premiered on September 20, 2016. The show is based on the early days of talk show host Dr. Phil McGraw's career, when he was a trial consultant. On May 6, 2020, CBS renewed the series for a fifth season, which premiered on November 16, 2020. On April 15, 2021, CBS renewed the series for a sixth and final season which premiered on October 7, 2021.

Series overview

Episodes

Season 1 (2016–17)

Season 2 (2017–18)

Season 3 (2018–19)

Season 4 (2019–20)

Season 5 (2020–21)

Season 6 (2021–22)

Ratings

Season 1

Season 2

Season 3

Season 4

Season 5

Season 6

Home media

References

External links 

Bull